Julia Pons Genescà (born 27 July 1994) is a Spanish field hockey player for the Spanish  national team.

She participated at the 2018 Women's Hockey World Cup.

References

1994 births
Living people
Spanish female field hockey players
Field hockey players at the 2020 Summer Olympics
Olympic field hockey players of Spain